The Selfoss women's football, commonly known as Selfoss team is the women's football department of the Ungmennafélag Selfoss multi-sport club. It is based in Selfoss, Iceland, and currently plays in the Úrvalsdeild kvenna, the top-tier women's football league in Iceland. The team plays it home games at the JÁVERK-völlur.

History
In August 2019, Selfoss won its first major trophy when it defeated KR in the Icelandic Cup final. On 6 June 2020, the team won the Icelandic Super Cup after defeating Valur 2 - 1.

Players

First Team Squad

Trophies
Icelandic cup
Winner: 2019
Runner-up: 2014, 2015
Icelandic Super Cup
Winner: 2020

Managers
 Valorie O'Brien (2015–2016)
 Guðjón Bjarni Hálfdánarson (2016)
 Alfreð Elías Jóhannsson (2016–present)

Notable players
 Brenna Lovera
 Ally Haran
 Chanté Sandiford
 Dagný Brynjarsdóttir
 Donna-Kay Henry
 Hólmfríður Magnúsdóttir
 Hrafnhildur Hauksdóttir
 Kelsey Wys
 Kristrún Rut Antonsdóttir
 Olga Færseth

References

External links
 Selfoss football Official Website

Selfoss
Úrvalsdeild Women clubs
UMF Selfoss